Ronald Jones II (born August 3, 1997) is an American football running back for the Kansas City Chiefs of the National Football League (NFL). He played college football at USC.

A heavily recruited high school running back out of the state of Texas, he chose to attend USC.  He finished his college career with over 3600 yards rushing over three seasons, and left college football a year early, being selected by the Tampa Bay Buccaneers in the second round of the 2018 NFL Draft.  After a rookie 2018 season where he saw limited action as a back-up, Jones took over the Buccaneers' starting running back position part way through the 2019 campaign, finishing the season with 9 starts and leading the team with 724 yards rushing.  He started the 2020 season as the team's starter, only relinquishing the job to Leonard Fournette after a late season COVID-19 diagnosis kept him out of the last few games of the regular season.  Returning for the playoffs, he split time with Fournette in the backfield, and won Super Bowl LV with the rest of the Buccaneers at season's end.  In 2021, he relinquished his primary starting role to Fournette, and while he appeared in 16 regular-season games, his production was limited.  A late-season injury kept him from participating in the 2021 playoffs.

Early years
Jones attended McKinney North High School in McKinney, Texas where he ran track and played football. He played tailback for the Bulldogs high school football team. Jones was rated by Rivals.com as a four-star recruit and in 2015 was ranked as the fourth best running back and 40th best player overall. He committed to the University of Southern California (USC) to play college football.

College career
Jones played college football at USC under head coaches Steve Sarkisian and Clay Helton. As a freshman in 2015, Jones played 14 games with 987 rushing yards, 39 receiving yards, and 9 total touchdowns. As a sophomore in 2016, Jones played 13 games with 1,082 rushing yards, 79 receiving yards, and 13 total touchdowns. As a junior in 2017, Jones played 13 games with 1,550 rushing yards, 165 receiving yards, and 20 total touchdowns. After his junior year, Jones decided to forgo his senior year and enter the 2018 NFL Draft.

College statistics

Professional career

Tampa Bay Buccaneers

2018
Jones was drafted by the Tampa Bay Buccaneers in the second round with the 38th overall pick in the 2018 NFL Draft. He was the fifth running back to be selected that year. He made his NFL debut in Week 4 against the Chicago Bears. In the 48–10 loss, he had ten carries for 29 rushing yards. During Week 7, against the Cleveland Browns, he scored his first NFL rushing touchdown as the Buccaneers won in overtime by a score of 26–23. He finished the 2018 season with 23 carries for 44 yards and one rushing touchdown.

2019
Jones was utilized both in the rushing and passing game for the Buccaneers in 2019. He totaled four games going over 100 scrimmage yards, including one 106-rushing yard performance in Week 17 against the Atlanta Falcons. In the 2019 season, Jones finished with 172 carries for 724 rushing yards and six rushing touchdowns to go along with 31 receptions for 309 receiving yards.

2020
In Week 4 against the Los Angeles Chargers, Jones finished with 111 rushing yards during the 38–31 win.  During Thursday Night Football against the Chicago Bears in Week 5, Jones finished with 106 rushing yards as the Buccaneers lost by a score of 19–20. In Week 6 against the Green Bay Packers, he had 23 carries for 113 rushing yards and two rushing touchdowns in the 38–10 victory. In Week 10 against the Carolina Panthers, Jones lost a fumble to begin the game, but later countered with a 98-yard touchdown. The 98-yard run was the longest play in franchise history. Overall, he finished the game with 192 rushing yards on 23 carries as the Bucs won 46–23. In Week 12 against the Kansas City Chiefs, Jones rushed for 66 yards and caught one pass for a 37 yard touchdown during the 27–24 loss. Jones was placed on the reserve/COVID-19 list by the Buccaneers on December 16, 2020, and activated on December 29, 2020. Overall, Jones finished the 2020 season as the Buccaneers leading rusher with 978 rushing yards and seven rushing touchdowns to go along with 28 receptions for 165 receiving yards and one receiving touchdown.

With the Buccaneers finishing the season 11–5, the team earned a playoff spot. During Super Bowl LV against the Kansas City Chiefs, Jones finished with 61 rushing yards as the Buccaneers won 31–9.

2021
In the 2021 season, Jones saw a lessened role with Leonard Fournette getting more rushing opportunities. Jones appeared in 16 games and started three. He finished with 101 carries for 428 rushing yards and four rushing touchdowns.

Kansas City Chiefs
Jones signed with the Kansas City Chiefs on March 27, 2022.

NFL career statistics

References

External links

 Kansas City Chiefs bio
 USC Trojans bio

1997 births
Living people
American football running backs
People from McKinney, Texas
Players of American football from Texas
Sportspeople from the Dallas–Fort Worth metroplex
Tampa Bay Buccaneers players
Kansas City Chiefs players
USC Trojans football players